Pembridge Hall is a non-selective preparatory school for girls located in Notting Hill, London, England. It is part of the Alpha Plus Group.

History
The origins of Pembridge Hall School stem from a convent school, 'Our Lady of Sion' which was founded in Chepstow Villas, Notting Hill in 1979 by the Sisters of Sion.

In 1983, the school moved to 18 Pembridge Square, where the Lower School is currently based and became known for the first time as Pembridge Hall.

In 2002 the school was bought by the Alpha Plus Group and in the following year the Middle and Upper School expanded into number 10 Pembridge Square.

Admissions 
Pembridge Hall is a non-selective school. Applications for Kindergarten are processed by calendar month to ensure an even distribution of birthdays throughout the year. Applications for older pupils are subject to assessment and interview.

Academics
Pupils study the full range of National Curriculum subjects as well as learning Philosophy and having the opportunity to take LAMDA lessons. Sport and the Arts feature strongly on the curriculum as well as a wide variety of both day and residential trips.

The 2010 ISI inspection report commended the school for its excellence in teaching, pastoral care and relationship with parents.

Extra-curricular 
Girls take part in a wide range of extra-curricular activities during and after the school day. Music and sport are very well represented and the breadth of clubs allows for all girls to pursue their interests whether that be in cooking, fencing, chess, martial arts or Irish dancing.

At Pembridge Hall School, girls are allocated a House to which they will belong throughout their time at the school. There are four Houses, each one named after a famous woman.

Senior School Transition 
Upon leaving Pembridge Hall, pupils typically gain entry to a range of London day schools including Godolphin and Latymer School, Francis Holland School, More House, Queen's College, London and St Paul's Girls' School. A number of pupils chose to move on to boarding schools, including St Mary's School, Ascot and Wycombe Abbey.

References
 https://www.tatler.com/school/pembridge-hall-tatler-school-guide

External links
School Website
Profile on the ISC website
https://ftalphaville.ft.com/2019/01/25/1548410430000/A-business-model-fit-to-educate-royalty/
https://ftalphaville.ft.com/2019/03/28/1553775803000/The-Alpha-Plus-pension-problem-/
https://ftalphaville.ft.com/2019/06/06/1559821404000/Alpha-Plus-is-still-losing-money/

Private girls' schools in London
Preparatory schools in London
Private schools in the Royal Borough of Kensington and Chelsea